Bentley is an unincorporated community in Atoka County, Oklahoma, United States. It lies east of the county seat of Atoka, off Highway 3.

A post office was established at Bentley, Indian Territory on June 1, 1903. It was named for Alva Bentley, a territorial-era educator. At the time of its founding, the community was located in Atoka County, Choctaw Nation.

There was once a school at Bentley, but it has closed down. Its post office closed on August 30, 1963.

On the main street of Bentley, there is a fire department, community center and a Southern Baptist Church.

Demographics

References

Unincorporated communities in Atoka County, Oklahoma
Unincorporated communities in Oklahoma